The 1975 World Junior Ice Hockey Championships were between December 26, 1974, and January 5, 1975, in several venues in Winnipeg and Brandon in Canada and in Minneapolis, Bloomington, and Fargo in the United States.
The Soviet team won the tournament with a perfect 5–0 record.
This was the second edition of the Ice Hockey World Junior Championship, but the results are not included in official IIHF records.
Canada was represented by an all-star team from just the Western Canada Hockey League, while the other five nations were represented by teams of all their top under-20 players.

Final standings
The tournament was a round-robin format, with each team playing each of the other five teams once each.

Results

Scoring leaders

Tournament awards

References

 "Matches internationaux des moins de 20 ans 1974/75". Retrieved 2011-10-18.

World Junior Ice Hockey Championships
World Junior Ice Hockey Championships
World Junior Ice Hockey Championships
World Junior Hockey Championships 1975
World Junior Ice Hockey Championships 1975
International ice hockey competitions hosted by Canada
World Junior Ice Hockey Championships
World Junior Ice Hockey Championships
Ice hockey competitions in Winnipeg
1970s in Winnipeg
World Junior Ice Hockey Championships
World Junior Ice Hockey Championships
Ice hockey competitions in Minneapolis
Sports in Fargo, North Dakota
World Junior Ice Hockey Championships
Bloomington, Minnesota
International ice hockey competitions hosted by the United States
World Junior Ice Hockey Championships
World Junior Ice Hockey Championships
World Junior Ice Hockey Championships
Ice hockey competitions in North Dakota